Catherine was an American alternative rock band from Chicago, Illinois, United States, that was active from 1985 to 1998. They were signed to TVT Records.

Breakup
In 1997, Catherine toured the US and Europe, opening for bands like Garbage and the Lemonheads in the US, and played several large festivals in Europe, including Reading (UK), Bizarre (Cologne), and Rocknacht (Leuven).

After their 1997 tour, the band began recording a new LP in the studio they built in a remodeled barn outside Watervliet, Michigan.   Meanwhile, TVT Records would not return the band's phone calls.  Opting out of their contract, Catherine was unable to secure a contract with another label.  Although a total of 13 songs were written and recorded, none of the songs from those sessions were ever released, although at least one, "Flight 518" was re-recorded in a later project by Rew.  The original "My Friend the Snake" sessions have only been heard by a few friends and fans of the band.   Discouraged by the lack of progress in securing a new contract, Evers and Tatnall left the band, followed by Keith Brown. Rew and Jendon reconvened in 2007 and currently play a couple of the 'lost' Catherine songs in the Chicago-based band "Bugglette", and independently released a new album, "Shame On You, Shanga Flowerdell" in late 2008

After a break from music, Jendon was a member of Zelienople for 3 years and appeared on several of their albums.  In addition to playing with Bugglette, he is currently performing and recording electronic music under his own name. His first solo CD, "Invisibility", was released on BloodLust! in late 2008.

Reunion
Catherine reunited to play 2 songs during the encore of the Smashing Pumpkins show at the Riviera Theatre, in Chicago, IL on October 14, 2011 for the first time since their break up in 1998.  The band had indicated they might play a full show in Chicago after this appearance, but as of 2020 there has been no further activity.

Music videos
Idiot (1994)
It's No Lie (1994)
Songs About Girls (1994)
Saint (1995)
Four-Leaf Clover (1996)
Whisper (1996)

Discography

References

TVT Records artists
Musical groups established in 1985
Musical groups disestablished in 1998
Musical groups reestablished in 2007
Alternative rock groups from Chicago
1985 establishments in Illinois